The Korea national under-20 football team, also known as the Korean unified football team, was the national under-20 team of Korea, being a combined representative team representing both South Korea and North Korea. Their only participation in FIFA-sanctioned tournaments was at the 1991 FIFA World Youth Championship.

History
The Inter-Korean Sports Conferences were held on the recommendation of the International Olympic Committee since 1963, but the conferences always broke down until the 1980s because both sides had not seen eye to eye. In February 1991, however, they decided to make Korean unified teams in table tennis and football.

In that same year, both South and North qualified for the FIFA World Youth Championship as winners and runners-up of the 1990 AFC Youth Championship, so they urgently made allied under-20 football team for the world championship despite concerns about communication and teamwork. Ten South Korean players and eight North Korean players formed the unified team, and they were managed by North Korean coach An Se-uk. The Korean Unification Flag, which composed of a blue image of the Korean Peninsula over a white background, was the symbol used by the team which competed under the name "Korea".

Korea began their World Youth Championship run by playing against favorites Argentina. The only goal of the match was a 30-yard strike goal made by North Korean footballer, Cho In-chol in the 88th minute which secured Korea's only win in the group stage. The Korean team would have lost its group stage match against Ireland but North Korean footballer Choi Chol made an equalizer in the 89th minute. They managed to advance to the knockout stage, although they conceded their last group stage match against hosts and eventual champions Portugal by a solitary goal, However, they suffered their worst defeat in the quarter-final match against Brazil.

Results

Coaching staff

Players

See also
Korea Team
North Korea national under-20 football team
South Korea national under-20 football team
North Korea–South Korea football rivalry

References

External links

Former national association football teams in Asia
1991 in South Korean football
1991 in North Korean football
North Korea–South Korea relations
football